"Plague in Surat: Crisis in Urban Governance" is a book published in 1996, by Archana Ghosh and S. Sami Ahmad, based on a plague outbreak in 1994 after a flood in Surat, India.

Publication
Plague in Surat: Crisis in Urban Governance was first published in 1996, by Institute of Social Sciences, New Delhi

See also
 Surat

References

Indian non-fiction books